is a Japanese seinen dōjinshi manga series written and illustrated by manga artist Takashi Okazaki. It was originally serialized irregularly in the avant-garde dōjinshi manga magazine Nou Nou Hau from November 1998 to September 2002. Inspired by Okazaki's love of soul and hip hop music and American media, it follows the life of Afro Samurai who witnessed his father, Rokutaro (owner of the No. 1 headband) killed by a male gunslinger named Justice (owner of the No. 2 headband) while he was a child. As an adult, Afro sets off to kill Justice and avenge his father.

The Afro Samurai dōjinshi was adapted into an anime miniseries by Gonzo in 2007, along with the television film sequel Afro Samurai: Resurrection in 2009, both of which starred Samuel L. Jackson as the title character. The anime gained two Emmy nominations, for Outstanding Individual Achievement in Animation, which it won an Outstanding Animated Program. After the release of the anime series, Okazaki remade the original Afro Samurai dōjinshi into a two-volume manga. To be only released in North America, Tor Books and Seven Seas Entertainment licensed the title and published it under their new Tor/Seven Seas imprint. In addition to the miniseries, Afro Samurai has been adapted into a video game and an upcoming live action film. For the television series and film, two soundtracks by the RZA of Wu-Tang Clan were released and a profile book in Japan.

Plot

In a feudal yet futuristic Japan, it is said that the one wearing the Number 1 headband is the greatest warrior in the world and shall possess god-like powers. Some believe it grants immortality, while others believe they received headbands from the gods themselves. The only way to obtain the Number 1 headband is to challenge and defeat the current wearer in combat. However, only the wearer of the Number 2 headband can challenge the Number 1 whereas anyone can challenge the Number 2. Thus, the Number 2 can survive. The Number 2 headband's current owner, the outlaw Justice, fights and kills Rokutaro, Afro's father and owner of the Number 1 headband. A young Afro witnesses the fight and vows revenge against Justice, who tells him to seek him out when he is "ready to duel a god."

Years later, Afro wears the Number 2 headband. He kills a group of assassins, criminals and mercenaries, sent by the Empty Seven Clan, for whom they seek the headband. Recalling his tragic past, Afro goes to Mount Shumi to face Jinno, his childhood friend and fellow samurai, who blames him for killing their master (who had the Number 2 headband). He defeats Jinno and tracks down Justice, who explains that there are other headbands in existence, ranging to an unspecified higher number. Claiming that he intends to use his power as the Number 1 to bring peace to all mankind, Justice reveals that he killed all headband bearers and decorated his safe house with corpses. Afro kills Justice and takes the Number 1 headband. Afro settles in as the new Number 1 while Jinno, now claiming all headbands from Justice, returns to take revenge.

In Afro Samurai: Resurrection, Jinno and his sister Sio, steal Rokutaro's body and the Number 1 headband. After killing Shichigoro and taking the Number 2 headband, Afro confronts the resurrected Rokutaro, who kills the siblings. Afro defeats Rokutaro, gives the Number 2 headband to Shichigoro's son Kotaro, and peacefully continues wearing the Number 1. Elsewhere, a unknown man meets the revived Justice.

Production
Okazaki started drawing African-American characters on items like Kleenex boxes when he was a teenager, inspired by his fondness for hip hop and soul music. He also drew ideas from American media and their depiction of Japanese culture. Takashi started combining elements of samurai into his work, eventually developing the design for Afro, which was also based in the legendary black samurai Yasuke who existed during the Sengoku period of Japan. Okazaki began writing the original dōjinshi, then called Afro Samurai!, when he and his friends started independently publishing the art magazine Nou Nou Hau. The preparatory "issue 0" of Nou Nou Hau was released in November 1998 with Afro Samurai artwork featured on the cover. Takashi Okazaki wrote the entire manga in the English direction, with elements from English and Japanese comics. He also used Afro Samurai for a cat food advertisement in the last pages of his manga book. In addition to the anime production, Okazaki re-made the dōjinshi, with an increased display of artistic skill. At the Japan Society from March 13 to June 14, 2009, original Afro Samurai dōjinshi artwork (as used on issue 0 of Nou Nou Hau) was showcased at the KRAZY!: The Delirious World of Anime + Manga + Video Games exhibition.

Media

Manga
The series was originally published in the self-funded Nou Nou Hau dōjinshi magazine. First appearing in issue 0, the dōjinshi version was first published from September 1999 to October 2000. After the release of the anime version, Okazaki recreated the original dōjinshi. Although the recreation of the original manga was created in Japan, it was first published in the United States by Seven Seas Entertainment and Tor Books in two tankōbon volumes. As a special supplement, thumb-nail sized clips of the original dōjinshi were shown at the end of the first volume. The English release of the manga was Tor Books and Seven Seas' first joint publication under the newly formed Tor/Seven Seas imprint. The manga was also released in Italy through Panini Comics' manga publishing division Planet Manga, starting on April 9, 2009. The manga was released in one volume in Japan on December 18, 2009. The limited edition came with all the issues of the original dōjinshi included in a separate volume. A "director's cut" of the manga was set to be released on July 26, 2022 with Titan Comics taking over the publishing under their new "Titan Manga" imprint before being delayed to December 13, 2022.

Anime
One of Okazaki's friends decided to make action figures based on characters, which were released in small amounts. After they were created, a producer from the anime studio, Gonzo, happened to find them and thought about the animated miniseries based on the manga. It took three years to develop, and that the studio created a trailer, which happened to catch the attention of Samuel L. Jackson. It was announced that the series would be a five-episode "creative collaboration", between Jackson, Okazaki and Gonzo, and Wu-Tang Clan member RZA served as a music composer.

In 2006, it was announced that Funimation acquired the rights to the anime series which would premiere on Spike, now known as the Paramount Network, later that year, and that Jackson would voice Afro. Afro Samurai debuted on January 4, 2007. The series premiered worldwide on Spike's website, where they streamed the first episode online. On May 3, 2007, the series premiered on Japanese television, in English with Japanese subtitles, and for the first time completely uncut.

On May 11, 2007, Funimation released the first Afro Samurai DVDs at Anime Central, at their own booth, the regular Afro Samurai: TV Version and the uncut Afro Samurai: Director's Cut. Both DVDs were released to the public on May 22, 2007. On September 4, 2007, all five episodes of Afro Samurai were released on iTunes. To promote this, Funimation released eight custom designed iPods by Takashi Okazaki. In 2008, Funimation released the Afro Samurai anime series onto Xbox Live in high definition format and also debuted on Blu-ray Disc in that year. The series was shown at the German Film Festival in Germany.

Films
In an Associated Press interview in 2007, Okazaki confirmed there would be a sequel to the anime series, and that it would air on Paramount Network. In 2008, the sequel was announced to be a television film, Afro Samurai: Resurrection, with Lucy Liu and Mark Hamill joining the cast. Hip hop artist The RZA also came back to provide the soundtrack for the film. Afro Samurai: Resurrection debuted on Spike on January 25, 2009. On July 16, 2009, Afro Samurai: Resurrection was nominated for an Emmy in the "Outstanding Animated Program (for programming one hour or more)" category in the 61st Primetime Emmy Awards and the Creative Arts Emmy Awards. At the Emmy awards, Afro Samurai: Resurrection lost to Destination Imagination, a television film based on Foster's Home for Imaginary Friends. The art director of Afro Samurai: Resurrection, Shigemi Ikeda, won an Emmy for his work on Resurrection, which is the first ever awarded for work on a Japanese-animated production. Afro Samurai: Resurrection was the first Japanese anime to be nominated for and win an Emmy. Late 2009 also saw the release of Afro Samurai: Complete Murder Sessions on Blu-ray and DVD. A 4-disc collection of both Afro Samurai Director's Cut and Afro Samurai: Resurrection, together in one complete boxset.

Announced at the 2006 San Diego Comic-Con International, a live action version of the series is said to be in the making. On July 21, 2011, Gonzo K.K. announced that Indomina Group had obtained the rights to produce the film, with Samuel L. Jackson, Jasbinder Singh Mann (Indomina Group Vice Chairman and CEO), Shin Ishikawa (Gonzo Studios) as producers; Eli Selden of Anonymous Content as executive producer. Production, however, stalled when Indomina Group suspended North American operations and shut its US office.

Video games
In 2005, Gonzo had awarded Namco Bandai Games exclusive rights to publish two Afro Samurai video games, as announced that year. The debut trailer of the first game was released at the company's Editor's Day presentation. Afro Samurai was released for the Xbox 360 and PlayStation 3 on January 27, 2009. A sequel, titled Afro Samurai 2: Revenge of Kuma was released for the PlayStation 4 and Microsoft Windows on September 22, 2015. The game was developed by Redacted Studios and published by Versus Evil. An Xbox One version was planned to be released on October 9, 2015, but after the negative reception of the game, it was never released. The game was eventually delisted in November 2015, due to the negative reception.

Soundtracks
Wu-Tang Clan member RZA produced the soundtrack for both the Afro Samurai TV series and the TV movie sequel Afro Samurai: Resurrection. The first soundtrack for the anime series, The RZA Presents: Afro Samurai: The Soundtrack was released on January 30, 2007, by Koch Records (now known as E1 Music). The second soundtrack for the TV movie, The RZA Presents: Afro Samurai: Resurrection: The Soundtrack was also released by Koch Records on January 27, 2009.

Voice cast
 Samuel L. Jackson - Afro Samurai, Ninja Ninja
 Mark Hamill - Bin, Oden Shop Master
 Lucy Liu - Sio
 Kelly Hu - Okiku / Otsuru
 Ron Perlman - Justice
 Jeff Bennett - Hachiro, Foo
 Steve Blum - Assassin
 S. Scott Bullock - Dharman
 Terrence C. Carson - Sword Master, Brother 4
 Grey DeLisle - Oyuki, Woman
 John DiMaggio - Brother 2, Giant, Patron #2, Ivanov
 Greg Eagles - Rokutaro, Brother 6
 John Kassir - Shosun
 Phil LaMarr - Teenage Afro Samurai, Brother 1, Brother 3, Brother 5, Kuro
 Yuri Lowenthal - Jinno/Kuma
 Jason Marsden - Sasuke
 Liam O'Brien - Kihachi, Patron #4
 Crystal Scales - Young Afro Samurai
 Dwight Schultz - Assassin, Patron #1, Ronin
 Tara Strong - Otsuru, Jiro
 Fred Tatasciore - Juzo, Patron #5, Shuzo
 James Arnold Taylor - Yashichi
 Dave Wittenberg - Assassin, Patron #3, Punk, Matasaburo

Crew
 Samuel L. Jackson - Executive producer
 Jamie Simone - Casting and voice director

Reception
The manga series has received generally positive reviews from critics. Scott Green, writer of the Anime AICN segment of Ain't It Cool News said that the manga "is a work of design" and that it "utilizes the medium to which it is applied as a platform rather than as an ends unto itself." Scott notes that Okazaki does not have a "head for manga as a storytelling form" and that the "manga labors to show off Okazaki's design." Anime News Network reviewer, Carlo Santos stated about the anime that "like most typical action-adventures, the story starts out slow and only picks up toward the middle and end when the blades really start flying" and that "Afro Samurai is hardly a complex story" and that it only has "a handful of characters and a straightforward beat-the-next-guy plotline". Carlo Santos also noted that "the original Afro Samurai manga is pretty lousy" and that Takashi Okazaki often gets lost in "incomprehensible scribbles" and "style over substance." Volume 2 of Afro Samurai also charted 147 on ComiPress' "Top 250 Manga Volumes" of February 2009. The Blu-ray of the anime series charted #16 on VideoScan's Blu-ray charts. In January 2009, IGN ranked the series 90th on a list of the top 100 animated series, saying that the over-the-top violence and quirky story and characters made the show enjoyable.

China ban
On June 12, 2015, the Chinese Ministry of Culture listed Afro Samurai among 38 anime and manga titles banned in China.

Notes

References

External links

 
 Official Afro Samurai: Resurrection website 
 Official Gomanga page
 
 
 Afro Samurai: Resurrection at Internet Movie Database

1999 manga
2000s American black cartoons
Action anime and manga
Anime and manga about revenge
Anime series based on manga
Censored television series
Doujinshi
Fuji TV original programming
Gonzo (company)
Manga Entertainment
Post-apocalyptic anime and manga
Samurai in anime and manga
Seinen manga
Seven Seas Entertainment titles
Television censorship in China
Titan Books titles
Works banned in China